Dinko Fabris is an Italian musicologist. He specializes in lute music, the music of Naples, and Italian music in general, having written books on Italian composers such as Andrea Falconieri, Andrea Gabrieli, Francesco Provenzale and Francesco Cavalli. He holds teaching posts at the Conservatory of Bari and the University of Basilicata, and was president of the International Musicological Society from 2012 to 2017.

Life and career
Dinko Fabris attended the Conservatorio di Verona to study lute, followed by study at the University of Bologna for Italian literature and musicology. He received a PhD from the Royal Holloway, University of London. A visiting professor at the University of Paris, University of Melbourne and University of Ljubljana, Fabris has received fellowships from the University of Melbourne and the Warburg Institute. He teaches at the Conservatory of Bari, and since 2001 at the University of Basilicata as well.

Fabris has advised on numerous scholarly music edition, such as the Opere di Francesco Cavalli and the New Gesualdo Edition. He is a music consultant for the Pontifical Council for Culture and was president of the International Musicological Society from 2012 to 2017.

Fabris' speciality is on lute music and the music of Naples. He has also published books on a variety of Italian composers, including Andrea Falconieri, Andrea Gabrieli, Francesco Provenzale and Francesco Cavalli. Other publications include a survey on the music of Ferrera and Henry Purcell, as well as over 80 articles. His better known works include Music in Seventeenth-Century Naples (2007) and a 2016 book on Handel's Partenope.

Publications

Books

Articles

References

External links
 Dinko Fabris's profile at the Academia Europaea

20th-century Italian musicologists
21st-century musicologists
Year of birth missing (living people)
Living people
International Musicological Society presidents